Hutchinson Island South is a census-designated place (CDP) on the barrier island of Hutchinson Island in St. Lucie County, Florida, United States. The South in its name refers to its location in the southern part of St. Lucie County, as it is actually in the central part of the island as a whole. The population was 4,846 at the 2000 census. It is part of the Port St. Lucie Metropolitan Statistical Area. Its mail is delivered from Jensen Beach 34957 in nearby Martin County. The Jensen Beach post office has a postal contract substation known as Hutchinson Beach located at 11007 South Ocean Drive, but it offers only post office boxes and counter services.

Geography
Hutchinson Island South is located at  (27.286391, -80.220669).

Transportation
The primary road is South Ocean Drive, which is also known as State Road A1A and passes from north to south through the community.

Demographics

As of the census of 2010, there were 5,201 people, 2,827 households, and 1,749 families residing in the CDP. The racial makeup of the CDP was 98.95% White, 0.14% African American, 0.12% Native American, 0.23% Asian, 0.10% from other races, and 0.45% from two or more races. Hispanic or Latino of any race were 0.89% of the population.

There were 2,827 households, out of which 1.8% had children under the age of 18 living with them, 59.0% were married couples living together, 1.8% had a female householder with no husband present, and 38.1% were non-families. 34.2% of all households were made up of individuals, and 24.5% had someone living alone who was 65 years of age or older.  The average household size was 1.71 and the average family size was 2.08.

In the CDP, the population was spread out, with 1.8% under the age of 18, 0.7% from 18 to 24, 6.6% from 25 to 44, 29.5% from 45 to 64, and 61.4% who were 65 years of age or older.  The median age was 69 years. For every 100 females, there were 88.6 males.  For every 100 females age 18 and over, there were 88.7 males.

The median income for a household in the CDP was $43,329, and the median income for a family was $49,978. Males had a median income of $47,150 versus $27,679 for females. The per capita income for the CDP was $37,575.  About 2.4% of families and 4.5% of the population were below the poverty line, including none of those under age 18 and 3.3% of those age 65 or over.

References

Census-designated places in St. Lucie County, Florida
Port St. Lucie metropolitan area
Jensen Beach, Florida
Census-designated places in Florida
Populated coastal places in Florida on the Atlantic Ocean
Beaches of St. Lucie County, Florida
Beaches of Florida